Virginia "Ginny" V. Lyons (born September 24, 1944) is an American politician serving as a Democratic member of the Vermont State Senate, representing the Chittenden senate district.

She was first elected to the Vermont State Senate in 2000 and continues in that office.

Biography
Lyons was born in Auburn, New York, on September 24, 1944. She received an A.B. degree in zoology from Drew University in 1966, an M.S. in nutritional biochemistry from Rutgers University in 1968, and a doctorate of policy and administration from the University of Vermont. She is married to Richard Lyons, MD, and has two daughters. Lyons moved to Williston, Vermont, in 1974 and continues to reside there. She is a part-time professor for the Vermont State Colleges.

Public life
She has served as:

Chair of the Williston select board.
Justice of the Peace for Williston.
Williston Fence Viewer.
Chittenden County Regional Planning Commission, alternate member.
Chittenden County Regional Planning Commission, plan update committee.
Chittenden County Regional Planning Commission, legislative and economic development committee.
State Senator, elected in 2000 and reelected in 2002, 2004, 2006, 2008, 2010, 2012, 2014, and 2016.

See also
Members of the Vermont Senate, 2005–2006 session
Members of the Vermont Senate, 2007–2008 session

References

External links
Vermont Senate Biographies

1944 births
Living people
Women state legislators in Vermont
Democratic Party Vermont state senators
Politicians from Auburn, New York
People from Williston, Vermont
Drew University alumni
University of Vermont alumni
Rutgers University alumni
21st-century American politicians
21st-century American women politicians